The men's 50 metre freestyle competition of the swimming event at the 2017 Southeast Asian Games was held on 25 August at the National Aquatic Centre in Kuala Lumpur, Malaysia.

Records

Schedule
All times are Malaysia Standard Time (UTC+08:00)

Results

Heats
The heats were held on 25 August.

Heat 1

Heat 2

Final

The final was held on 25 August.

References

Men's 50 metre freestyle